Welsman is a surname. Notable people with the surname include:

 Carol Welsman (born 1960), vocalist and pianist
 Frank Welsman (1873–1952), conductor
 Jennifer Welsman, Canadian ballet dancer
 John Welsman (born 1955), Canadian composer

See also
 Toronto Symphony Orchestra (Welsman)